Martin Adel Makary is a British-American surgeon, professor, author and medical commentator. He practices surgical oncology and gastrointestinal laparoscopic surgery at the Johns Hopkins Hospital, is Mark Ravitch Chair in Gastrointestinal Surgery at Johns Hopkins School of Medicine, and teaches public health policy as Professor of Surgery and Public Health at the Johns Hopkins Bloomberg School of Public Health.

Makary is an advocate for disruptive innovation in medicine and physician-led initiatives such as The Surgical Checklist, which he developed at Johns Hopkins, and was later popularized in Atul Gawande's best-selling book The Checklist Manifesto. Makary was named one of the most influential people in healthcare by HealthLeader magazine. In 2018, Makary was elected to the National Academy of Medicine.

During the COVID-19 pandemic, Makary has been a prolific pundit discussing the topics of COVID-19 and mitigation strategies. He was an early advocate for universal masking to control the pandemic and recommends vaccines for adults, but has been an outspoken opponent of broad vaccine mandates and some COVID restrictions at schools.

Education
Makary was born in Liverpool, England, and moved to Baltimore as a young child. His family later moved to Danville, Pennsylvania, when his father took a job as a hematologist at the Geisinger Medical Center. Makary holds degrees from Bucknell University, Thomas Jefferson University and Harvard University. He was president of the student body at Harvard, and later served on the alumni board. He completed a Masters of Public Health (M.P.H.) degree, with a concentration in health policy.

Professional career
Makary completed a surgical residency at Georgetown University in Washington D.C. where he also worked as a writer for The Advisory Board Company. Makary completed sub-specialty surgery training at Johns Hopkins in surgical oncology and gastrointestinal surgery under surgeon John Cameron, before joining Cameron's faculty practice as a partner. In his first few years on the faculty at Johns Hopkins, Makary researched and wrote articles on the prevention of surgical complications. He published on frailty as a medical condition, and on safety and teamwork culture in medicine. Makary is the first author of the original scientific publications describing "The Surgery Checklist". Makary worked with the World Health Organization to develop the official World Health Organization Surgical Checklist. For his contributions to the field of medicine, Makary was named Mark Ravitch Chair in Gastrointestinal Surgery, an endowed chair at the Johns Hopkins University School of Medicine, becoming the youngest endowed chair recipient at the time at the university. Three years later, he was named the Credentials Chair and Director of Quality and Safety for Surgery at Johns Hopkins. In 2020, Makary was named Editor-in-Chief of MedPage Today. He was also appointed chief of the Johns Hopkins Islet Transplant Center, clinical lead for the Johns Hopkins Sibley Innovation Hub, Executive Director of Improving Wisely, a Robert Wood Johnson Foundation project to lower health care costs, is founder of the Johns Hopkins Center For Surgical Outcomes Research and Clinical Trials, and Professor of Surgery and Public Health at the Johns Hopkins Bloomberg School of Public Health.

Makary is a pancreatic surgeon and has pioneered novel surgical procedures. He was awarded the Nobility in Science Award by the National Pancreas Foundation for performing the world's first series of laparoscopic pancreas islet transplant operations. He has traveled with his international team overseas. Makary specializes in advanced laparoscopic surgery and performed the first laparoscopic Whipple surgery at Johns Hopkins and the first laparoscopic Frey's procedure for pancreatitis. 

Makary's research led to several partnerships, including a grant from the U.S. Department of Health and Human Services Agency for Healthcare Quality and Research, to study obesity treatment, and a grant from the same agency to implement safety programs at 100 U.S. hospitals, a project he collaborated on with Peter Pronovost and the American College of Surgeons. Makary was also the lead author in the original paper introducing a Hospital Survey of Patient Safety Culture.

He has written for The Wall Street Journal, USA Today, Time, Newsweek, and CNN, and appears on NBC and Fox News.

Makary has also called for the public reporting physician-endorsed quality measures by hospitals. He and Bryan Sexton have encouraged hundreds of hospitals to take the "Culture of Safety Survey" and make their results available to their communities. Makary also advocates for price transparency and has led efforts to ask hospitals to stop suing their low-income patients.

In 2016, Makary and his colleagues exposed loopholes in the Orphan Drug Act accounting for higher drug pricing.  His article "The Orphan Drug Act: Restoring the Mission to Rare Diseases", covered by Kaiser Heath News, led Senator Chuck Grassley's office to announce an investigation.

COVID-19 pandemic 
During the COVID-19 pandemic, Makary has been a proponent of treating the COVID-19 pandemic as a true public health threat, masking, vaccines and early vaccination strategies that prioritized maximum coverage against severe disease similar to the UK vaccination strategy, and protection provided by natural immunity. Dr. Makary has also been an outspoken opponent of vaccine mandates, various FDA & CDC policies, and restrictions at colleges and universities.   

In February 2020, Makary was vocal that the United States needed to take the threat of COVID-19 seriously and that people should stop all non-essential travel. He warned of disruptions to both the United States healthcare system and to people's daily lives. In addition Makary called for a national lockdown to help slow the spread of the virus and enable the healthcare system to respond and reduce morbidity and mortality. In May 2020, Makary advocated for universal masking in an effort to enable businesses and schools to re-open to minimize economic and educational damage across the United States. In May 2020, it was still debated by many in the scientific community as to whether masks provided much protection against infection, however high-quality masking has proven an effective measure at limiting the spread of COVID-19.   

In November 2020, Makary was critical of the pace at which the FDA were approving the mRNA vaccines from Pfizer. Makary had taken issue with the speed at which various US government health organizations had taken to evaluate medications or perform COVID-19 based research. In early February 2021, Makary advocated for prioritizing getting as many vaccinated with single doses vs holding vaccines back for second doses. Single dose vaccination strategies, like done in the United Kingdom, have shown to be effective and conditions upon when to implement single dose vaccination strategies have continued to be researched to assess optimal conditions for single or multiple doses.  

Makary stated in a February 2021 op-ed in The Wall Street Journal that "At the current trajectory" in the United States COVID-19 would "be mostly gone by April" 2021, primarily as a result of naturally acquired immunity. The article's estimates of population immunity were criticized for being higher than the best available data supported. On 1 May 2021, the national average 7 day case rate was 105 per 100,000, a rate of community transmission the CDC described as "High Transmission" (the highest of four categories).

Makary considers himself pro-vaccine but has also criticized vaccination mandates for populations other than healthcare workers. Makary recommended a single-dose mRNA vaccine regimen for children 12-17 to minimize the occurrence of myocarditis as a reaction, contrary to the CDC's finding that the risks of infection "far outweigh" those of the two-dose vaccine schedule. In December 2021 he appeared on a podcast to argue against vaccine boosters, referring to himself as an "unboosted male" and saying that the SARS-CoV-2 Omicron variant was "nature's vaccine".

Books
Makary is the author of the New York Times Best Selling book Unaccountable, in which he proposes that common sense, physician-led solutions can fix the healthcare system. The book was turned into the popular TV series, The Resident, which aired on Fox in 2018. Makary is also the author of Mama Maggie a personal story about his distant relative Magda Gobran, a Nobel Peace Prize nominee working in the garbage slums of Cairo. His latest book, The Price We Pay, was released in 2018 and describes how business leaders can lower their health care costs and explores the grass-roots movement to restore medicine to its noble mission. Makary is also the editor of the surgery textbook "General Surgery Review".

Awards and recognition
Makary is the recipient of numerous research and teaching awards, including the Best Teacher Award for Georgetown Medical School and research awards from the Washington Academy of Surgery and the New England Surgical Society. He has been a visiting professor at over 30 U.S. medical schools and lectures frequently on innovation in health care. In 2018, he was elected to the National Academy of Medicine.

References

External links

American surgeons
American male non-fiction writers
American medical writers
Bucknell University alumni
English emigrants to the United States
Harvard School of Public Health alumni
Johns Hopkins Hospital physicians
Johns Hopkins University faculty
Living people
People from Danville, Pennsylvania
Thomas Jefferson University alumni
Year of birth missing (living people)
Members of the National Academy of Medicine